State Route 270 (SR 270), also known as Old Columbia Road, is a  long east-west state highway in Middle Tennessee. It connects Chapel Hill with Unionville and Shelbyville.

Route description

SR 270 begins in Marshall County in Chapel Hill at an intersection with US 31A/SR 11/SR 99 just south of downtown. It goes east to leave Chapel Hill and pass through wooded areas, where it crosses a bridge over a creek, before passing through farmland to cross into Bedford County. The highway winds its way southeast, where it crosses over another creek, and passes through farmland and rural areas for several miles before coming to an end at an intersection with US 41A/SR 16 between Unionville and Shelbyville. The entire route of SR 270 is a two-lane rural highway.

Major intersections

References

270
Transportation in Marshall County, Tennessee
Transportation in Bedford County, Tennessee